Notolaemus is a genus of beetles in the family Laemophloeidae, containing the following species [list incomplete]:

 Notolaemus castaneus Erichson
 Notolaemus clarus Grouvelle
 Notolaemus cribratus Reitter
 Notolaemus elli Lefkovitch
 Notolaemus lewisi Reitter
 Notolaemus liganus Lefkovitch
 Notolaemus peringueyi Grouvelle
 Notolaemus perrieri Grouvelle
 Notolaemus perspicuus Grouvelle
 Notolaemus picinus Grouvelle
 Notolaemus riartus Lefkovitch
 Notolaemus unifasciatus Latreille
 Notolaemus ussuriensis Iablokoff-Khnzorian

References

External links
 iNaturalist World Checklist

Laemophloeidae